Ottavio Jemma (1 January 1925 – 25 December 2015) was an Italian screenwriter. He wrote for more than 40 films between 1959 and 2015.

Selected filmography

 Gideon and Samson (1965)
 Fantabulous Inc. (1967)
 The Libertine (1968)
 He and She (1969)
 The Fifth Day of Peace (1969)
 Where Are You Going All Naked? (1969)
 When Women Had Tails (1970)
 The Swinging Confessors (1970)
 Sacco e Vanzetti (1971)
 Secret Fantasy (1971)
 When Women Lost Their Tails (1972)
 The Eroticist (1972)
 Jus primae noctis (1972)
 Malicious (1973)
 La sbandata (1974)
 I'll Take Her Like a Father (1974)
 Lovers and Other Relatives (1974)
 The Sex Machine (1975)
 Submission (1976)
 Hitch-Hike (1977)
 Il corpo della ragassa (1979)
 The Good Thief (1980)
 La moglie in vacanza... l'amante in città (1980)
 Qua la mano (1980)
 Chaste and Pure (1981)
 Ricomincio da tre (1981)
 Culo e camicia (1981)
 Manolesta (1981)
 The Girl from Trieste (1982)
 Rich and Poor (1983)
 Mortacci (1989)

References

External links

1925 births
2015 deaths
Italian screenwriters
Italian male screenwriters